Trichodes nobilis is a beetle species of checkered beetles belonging to the family Cleridae, subfamily Clerinae. It can be found on Crete, in Greece, and Near East.

References

nobilis
Beetles of Europe
Beetles described in 1842